Barefoot Contessa is an American cooking show hosted by celebrity chef Ina Garten.

Barefoot Contessa may also refer to:

 The Barefoot Contessa, a 1954 drama film
 Barefoot Contessa (band), a British indie band of the late 1990s
 Judy Grable (1935–2008), American professional wrestler who used the ringname "The Barefoot Contessa"

See also
 Contessa (disambiguation)